The year 1915 in film involved some significant events.



Events
 February 1: Fox Film Corporation founded
 February 8: D.W Griffith's The Birth of a Nation premieres at Clune's Auditorium Los Angeles and breaks both box office and film length records (running at a total length of over three hours).
 February: Metro Pictures, a forerunner of Metro-Goldwyn-Mayer, is founded
 February 22: The Allan Dwan directed film David Harum is released. The film is the first in long line of a successful romantic onscreen pairings of actors May Allison and Harold Lockwood.
 March 15: Universal Studios Hollywood opens (1964).
 June 18: The Motion Picture Directors Association (MPDA) is formed by twenty-six film directors in Los Angeles, California.
 July: Triangle Film Corporation is founded in Culver City, California and attracts filmmakers D. W. Griffith, Thomas H. Ince and Mack Sennett
 September 11: A nitrate fire at Famous Players in New York destroys several completed but unreleased silent films which are later remade. Films lost include Mary Pickford's Esmerelda and The Foundling and John Barrymore's The Red Widow.
 October 1: A US court rules in United States v. Motion Picture Patents Co. that the Motion Picture Patents Company trust is monopolistic and orders it to be dissolved.
 November 18: Release of Inspiration, the first mainstream movie in which a leading actress (Audrey Munson) appears nude.
 December 13: Sessue Hayakawa becomes the first Asian actor to become a star in the US after his performance in The Cheat.
 The Duplex Corporation creates a Split Duplex, an early widescreen film format where the film image is rotated 90 degrees and occupies half of a conventional frame.
 Max Fleischer invents the rotoscoping animation process in the US.
 The Kinematograph Renters’ Society of Great Britain and Ireland is formed to represent film distribution companies

Top-grossing films (U.S.)

Notable films released in 1915
All following films are American, except where stated.

Adachihara Ubagaike Yurei (Japanese), starring Matsunosuke Onoe, produced in Japan by Nikkatsu 
Agony of Fear, directed by Giles Warren
Are You a Mason?, directed by Thomas N. Heffron, starring John Barrymore
The Arrow Maiden, directed by Francis Powers
Assunta Spina, starring Francesca Bertini –  (Italy)
The Avenging Hand (British) aka The Wraith of the Tomb, directed by Charles Calvert, written by William J. Elliott
Barnaby Rudge, directed by Thomas Bentley (Britain)
The Birth of a Nation, directed by D. W. Griffith, starring Lillian Gish
The Blood Seedling, produced by William Selig, directed by (and starring) Tom Santschi 
The Bribe, short film directed by Lucius Henderson for Universal, starring Charles Ogle
Call From the Dead, early zombie film directed by Clem Easton for Thanhouser Films
The Caprices of Kitty, directed by Phillips Smalley, starring Elsie Janis
Carmen, directed by Cecil B. DeMille, starring Geraldine Farrar
Carmen, directed by Raoul Walsh, starring Theda Bara
The Case of Becky, directed by Frank Reicher, starring Blanche Sweet
The Castle of Thornfield (Italian) adapted from the novel Jane Eyre by Charlotte Bronte
The Champion, starring Charles Chaplin and Edna Purviance
The Cheat, directed by Cecil B. DeMille, starring Fannie Ward and Sessue Hayakawa
The Cheval Mystery, directed by (and starring) Harry Myers for Victor Films
The Chronicles of Bloom Center, short comedy directed by Marshall Neilan 
The Circular Staircase, directed by Edward J. LeSaint for Selig Films, based on the novel by Mary Roberts Rinehart, starring Eugenie Besserer and Stella Razeto
The Crazy Clock Maker, comedy starring Oliver Hardy
A Cry in the Night (British) a science fiction film about a winged gorilla created by a mad scientist, directed by Ernest G. Batley
Destiny's Skein, directed and scripted by George Terwilliger, about a murderer with a split personality
The Devil (aka Satan's Pawn), based on the play by Ferenc Molnar, this film was produced and co-directed by Thomas H. Ince, starring Arthur Maude and Bessie Barriscale 
The Devil to Pay (British) short film directed by Edwin J. Collins, with a story similar to Faust
The Devil's Profession (British) written and directed by F.C.S. Tudor, foreshadowing Val Lewton's Bedlam (1946)
Double Trouble, starring Douglas Fairbanks
A Drama of the Castle, or Do the Dead Return? (French) 6-minute film written and directed by Abel Gance
The Dream Dance, directed by Leon D. Kent for Lubin Films, starring Lee Shumway
The Duel in the Dark, starring Arthur Bauer and Carey L. Hastings, features an evil hypnotist
The Dust of Egypt, mummy film directed by George D. Baker, starring Antonio Moreno and Edith Storey
Enoch Arden, starring Lillian Gish
The Eleventh Dimension, science fiction film produced and written by Raymond L. Schrock, directed by Clem Easton
Fatty's Spooning Days, starring Fatty Arbuckle, Mabel Normand, and The Keystone Cops
Faust, directed by Edward Sloman who also stars in the film
Filibus –  (Italy)
A Fool There Was, starring Theda Bara
Four Feathers
The Fox Woman, directed by Lloyd Ingraham, starring Seena Owen and Elmer Clifton
A Gentleman of Leisure, directed by George Melford, starring Wallace Eddinger
The Ghost Fakirs, a "Heinie and Louie" comedy short involving a haunted house
The Ghost of Twisted Oaks, voodoo film directed by Sidney Olcott for Lubin Films, starring Olcott's wife Valentine Grant
The Golden Chance, directed by Cecil B. DeMille, starring Cleo Ridgely and Wallace Reid
The Golem, aka Der Golem und Wie auf de Welt Kam (German/ Deutsche-Bioscop), directed by Paul Wegener and Henrik Galeen, starring Paul Wegener and Lyda Salmonova (Germany)
The Gray Horror, a haunted house film directed by Joseph W. Smiley, who also starred in it
The Greater Will, directed by Harley Knowles, starring Montagu Love, Cyril Maude and Lois Meredith 
The Hand of the Skeleton, French special effects film directed by Danish director George Schneevoight
The Haunting of Silas P. Gould (British) directed by Elwin Neame, starring (his wife) Ivy Close
Haunting Winds, directed by Carl M. Leviness for Universal, starring Frank MacQuarrie and Sydney Ayres
His Egyptian Affinity, reincarnated mummy film directed by Al Christie for Nestor Films, starring Victoria Ford
His Phantom Sweetheart, short horror/comedy produced and directed by Ralph W. Ince; the writer Earle Williams was also the star
Horrible Hyde, a 5-minute comedy version of "Dr. Jekyll and Mr. Hyde", directed by and starring Howell Hansel, filmed in Florida
The Hound of the Baskervilles Parts 3 and 4 (German film) directed by Richard Oswald, starring Alwin Neuss as Sherlock Holmes; Part 3 was called "The Uncanny Room" and Part 4 was "Legend of the Hound"(see 1914 for first two parts)
The Hound of the Baskervilles: The Dark Castle (German) Vitascope made their own conclusion to their earlier 1914 two-parter with this entry, directed by Willy Zeyn, starring Eugen Burg as Sherlock Holmes
The House of a Thousand Candles, haunted house film based on the novel by Meredith Nicholson, directed by Thomas N. Heffron, starring Harry Mestayer and Edgar Nelson 
The House With Nobody In It, a haunted house film based on the poem by Joyce Kilmer as well as a story by Clarence J. Harris; directed by Richard Garrick
The Immigrant
The Inner Brute, starring Warren Waite, Warda Howard and John Lorenz
An Innocent Sinner, directed by Kenean Buel, starring Katherine LaSalle and Guy Coombs
Inspiration
The Italian
Jane Eyre, based on the novel by Charlotte Bronte, directed by Travers Vale, starring Franklyn Ritchie, Louise Vale and Gretchen Hartman
The Japanese Mask, an obscure French/U.S. co-production made by Pathe/Aetna Films
The Lamb, starring Douglas Fairbanks
Legend of the Lone Tree, a "weird western" film directed by Ulysses Davis for Vitagraph, starring Myrtle Gnzalez and Alfred Vosburgh 
Life Without Soul, first full-length adaptation of the Mary Shelley novel Frankenstein (running 70 minutes); directed by Joseph W. Smiley, starring William A. Cohill as the scientist; the film was somewhat re-edited and re-released in 1916 also
The Live Mummy (British) a 13-minute comedy short
London's Yellow Peril (British) directed by Maurice Elvey, written by Eliot Stannard; Elvey later went on to make a series of silent Fu Manchu movies
Lord John in New York, first in a Universal Pictures series of five silent detective films, starring William Garwood as Lord John, directed by Edward LeSaint
Madame Butterfly, directed by Sidney Olcott, starring Mary Pickford
The Magic Skin, directed by Richard Ridgely for Thomas Edison's film company; this was the third film adaptation of Honore de Balzac's novel Le Peau de Chagrin
The Man Who Couldn't Beat God, directed by Maurice Costello and Robert Gaillard, both of whom starred also
The Man Who Stayed at Home – (GB)
Martyrs of the Alamo
The Mesmerist (British) directed by Percy Nash, starring Douglas Payne
Miss Jekyll and Madame Hyde, directed by Charles L. Gaskill and starring Helen Gardner; strangely this was more of an adaptation of Faust than the novel Dr. Jekyll and Mr. Hyde
The Missing Mummy, silent comedy directed by William Beaudine, starring Bud Duncan and Charles Inslee
The Monkey's Paw (British) this first film adaptation of the 1902 novel seems to have been based more on the 1907 play instead of the novel; directed by Sidney Northcote, starring John Lawson (who also starred in the play) 
The Moonstone, directed by Frank Hall Crane, starring Eugene O'Brien and Elaine Hammerstein, based on the 1868 novel by Wilkie Collins; this was the best known of the silent film versions
Mortmain, directed by Theodore Marston for Vitagraph, starring Robert Edeson; this surgical horror film's plot eerily foreshadowed that of the later Conrad Veidt film The Hands of Orlac (1924).
 Peer Gynt, directed by Raoul Walsh and Oscar Apfel
The Picture of Dorian Gray (Russian) - third film adaptation of the 1890 Oscar Wilde novel, wherein Dorian Gray is oddly played by a female actress (Varvara Yanova); directed by Vsevolod Meyerhold and Mikhail Doronin (both of whom also co-starred in the film)
The Picture of Dorian Gray, directed by Eugene Moore for Thanhouser Films (U.S.), starring Harris Gordon (as Dorian) and Helen Fulton; this was the fourth film adaptation of the Oscar Wilde novel
The Portrait (Russian) 8-minute fantasy film written and directed by Wladyslaw Starewicz, who later went on to direct The Viy that same year
 The Prisoner of Zenda, starring Henry Ainley and Gerald Ames (GB)
The Raven, directed by Charles Brabin, starring Henry B. Walthall and Wanda Howard, this was the third biopic to cover the life story of Edgar Allan Poe
Regeneration, directed by Raoul Walsh, starring Rockliffe Fellowes and Anna Q. Nilsson
The Return of Maurice Donnelly, directed by William Humphrey, starring Leo Delaney and Anders Randolph, conceived as a social fable against capital punishment
The Return of Richard Neal, mesmerism film directed by Edward T. Lowe Jr., starring Francis X. Bushman, Neil Craig and Ernest Maupin
Sagebrush Tom, starring Tom Mix
Satanic Rhapsody (Italian) directed by Nino Oxilia (who died in WWI), starring Lyda Borelli and Ugo Bazzini as Mephistopheles; film featured some tinted and hand-stenciled color scenes  
The Scorpion's Sting (British) aka The Devil's Bondman, directed by Percy Nash, starring George Bellamy
The Secret Room, directed by Tom Moore for Kalem Films (he also starred in the film)    
The Senator, directed by Joseph A. Golden
Shunen no hebi (translation: The Vengeful Snake) Japanese film directed by Uichiro Tamura
The Silent Command, directed by Robert Z. Leonard for Universal, starring Leonard and Ella Hall
The Soul of Broadway
The Soul of Phyra, directed by Charles Swickard, starring Enid Markey
The Spectre of the Vault (Italian) haunted tomb film directed by Ubaldo Maria Del Colle
The Strange Unknown, directed by Wilbe Melville, starring Helen Eddy and Dorothy Barrett; plot was influenced by Jane Eyre and The Woman in White
The Three Wishes, (French) obscure 8-minute fantasy film similar to The Monkey's Paw
Togakushi-yama no kijo (Japanese) short ghost film directed by Shozo Makino for Nikkatsu Films, starring Matsunosuke Onoe
The Tramp, directed by and starring Charles Chaplin
Le traquenard, starring Irène Bordoni – (France)
Trilby, directed by Maurice Tourneur, starring Clara Kimball Young as Trilby and Wilton Lackaye as Svengali; the film was slightly edited and re-released in 1917 and again in 1920
The Two Orphans, starring Theda Bara
The Unfaithful Wife, directed by J. Gordon Edwards, starring Genevieve Hamper and Warner Oland in one of his earliest roles
The Vivisectionist, directed by James W. Horne, starring Marin Sais and William H. West
The Warning (aka The Eternal Penalty), directed by Edmund Lawrence starring Henry Kolker; this moral diatribe against alcohol abuse involves a dream trip to Hell
The Wheels of Justice, directed by Theodore Marston
When the Spirits Moved, directed by Al Christie for Universal Pictures, starring Lee Moran and Eddie Lyons
Which is Witch? (British) 6-minute short directed by Edwin J. Collins
A Witch of Salem Town, directed by Lucius Henderson, starring Mary Fuller and Curtis Benton
Work, directed by & starring Charles Chaplin
The Wraith of Haddon Towers, directed by Arthur Maude, starring Constance Crawley and Arthur Maude
Yurei Yashiki (Japanese) translation The Haunted House, directed by Kyomatsu Hosomaya for Nikksatsu

Short film series
Broncho Billy Anderson (1910–1916)
Harold Lloyd (1913–1921)
Charlie Chaplin (1914–1923)

Births
January 1 – Maxine Doyle, actress (died 1973)
January 9 
Anita Louise, actress (died 1970)
Fernando Lamas, actor (died 1982)
January 11 – Veda Ann Borg, actress (died 1973)
January 18 – Catherine Craig, actress (died 2004)
January 26 – William Hopper, actor; son of Hedda Hopper (died 1970)
January 29 – Bill Peet, Disney author and illustrator (died 2002)
January 30 – Dorothy Dell, actress (died 1934)
February 7 – Eddie Bracken, actor (died 2002)
February 12 – Lorne Greene, actor (died 1987)
February 18 – Phyllis Calvert, actress (died 2002)
February 20 – Philip Friend, actor (died 1987)
February 21 – Ann Sheridan, actress (died 1967)
February 23 – Jon Hall, actor (died 1979)
February 28 – Zero Mostel, actor (died 1977)
March 2 – Lona Andre, actress (died 1992)
March 17 – Henry Bumstead, art director (died 2006)
March 19 – Patricia Morison, actress (died 2018)
April 10 – Harry Morgan, American actor (died 2011)
April 21 – Anthony Quinn, actor (died 2001)
May 5
Alice Faye, actress, (died 1998)
Ben Wright (English actor), (died 1989)
May 6 – Orson Welles, actor, director (died 1985)
May 8 – John Archer, American actor (died 1999)
May 15 – Bill Williams, actor, (died 1992)
May 19 – Renée Asherson, actress, (died 2014)
May 31 – Barbara Pepper, actress, (died 1969)
June 1 - John Randolph (actor), American actor (died 2004)
June 12 – Priscilla Lane, singer, actress (died 1995)
June 16 - Anthony Sharp, English actor (died 1984)
June 20 - Terence Young (director), Irish director and screenwriter (died 1994)
July 18 – Phyllis Brooks, American actress, model (died 1995)
August 2 – Gary Merrill, actor (died 1990)
August 11 – Jean Parker, American actress (died 2005)
August 15 – Signe Hasso, (died 2002)
August 29 – Ingrid Bergman, actress (died 1982)
September 5 – Jack Buetel, actor (died 1989)
September 10 – Edmond O'Brien, actor (died 1985)
September 14 – Douglas Kennedy, actor (died 1973)
September 29
Brenda Marshall, American actress (died 1992)
Anne Nagel, American actress (died 1966)
October 29 – Evi Rauer, Estonian actress (died 2004) 
December 7 – Eli Wallach, actor (died 2014)
December 12 – Frank Sinatra, singer, actor (died 1998)
December 13 – Curd Jürgens, actor (died 1982)
December 14 – Dan Dailey, actor (died 1978)
December 17 – Joan Woodbury, actress (died 1989)
December 22 – Barbara Billingsley, actress (died 2010)
December 29 – Jo Van Fleet, actress (died 1996)

Deaths
 January 10 – Marshall P. Wilder, 55, American diminutive stage and screen actor
 April 26 – John Bunny, 51, American silent film comedian, A Strand of Blond Hair, Bunny's Little Brother, Bunny Backslides
 June 5 – John C. Rice, 58, stage and film actor, The Kiss
 June 16 – Elmer Booth, 32, American silent screen actor, brother of film editor Margaret Booth, The Musketeers of Pig Alley, The Narrow Road, An Unseen Enemy
 October 31 – Blanche Walsh, 42, American stage actress appeared in Zukor's 3 reel feature "Resurrection" 1912

Film debuts
 Mary Boland – The Edge of the Abyss
 Alice Brady – The Boss
 Donald Brian – The Voice in the Fog
 Marie Cahill – Judy Forgot
 Yakima Canutt – Foreman of Bar Z Ranch (uncredited)
 Laura Hope Crews – The Fighting Hope
 Reginald Denny – Niobe
 Elliott Dexter – Heléne of the North
 Marie Doro – The Morals of Marcus
 Douglas Fairbanks – The Lamb
 Geraldine Farrar – Carmen
 W. C. Fields – Pool Sharks
 Pauline Frederick – The Eternal City
 John Gilbert – Aloha Oe (uncredited)
 Charlotte Greenwood – Jane
 Otto Kruger – A Mother's Confession
 Edmund Lowe – The Wild Olive
 Victor Moore – Snobs
 Edna Purviance – A Night Out (short) (uncredited)
 Esther Ralston – The Deep Purple (uncredited)
 Valeska Suratt – The Soul of Broadway
 Erich Von Stroheim – actor, assistant director, The Birth of a Nation (uncredited); costume designer, wardrobe assistant, Ghosts
 Charlotte Walker – Kindling 
 Fannie Ward – The Marriage of Kitty

References

 
Film by year